originally released as  in Japan, is a 1982 arcade game developed by Data East initially for its DECO Cassette System. The player is chef Peter Pepper, who must walk over hamburger ingredients located across a maze of platforms while avoiding characters who pursue him.

In the United States, Data East USA licensed BurgerTime for distribution by Bally Midway as a standard dedicated arcade game. Data East also released its own version of BurgerTime in the United States through its DECO Cassette System. The Data East and Midway versions are distinguished by the manufacturer's name on the title screen and by the marquee and cabinet artworks, as the game itself is identical.

The game's original Japanese title Hamburger changed outside of Japan to BurgerTime, reportedly to avoid potential trademark issues. In addition to all releases in the Western world, BurgerTime also became the title used for the Japanese ports and sequels.

When Data East went bankrupt in 2003, G-Mode bought most of Data East's intellectual properties, including BurgerTime, BurgerTime Deluxe, Super BurgerTime, and Peter Pepper's Ice Cream Factory.

Gameplay

The object of the game is to complete a number of hamburgers while avoiding enemy foods. The player controls the protagonist, chef Peter Pepper, with a four-position joystick and a button.

Each board consists of a maze of planks and ladders in which giant burger ingredients (e.g., buns, patties, lettuce/tomato, etc.) are laid out. When Peter walks the full length of an ingredient, it falls to the level below, knocking down any ingredient that happens to be there. A burger is completed when all of its vertically aligned ingredients have been dropped out of the maze and onto a waiting plate, and the player must complete all burgers to finish the board.

Three types of enemy food items wander the maze: Mr. Hot Dog, Mr. Pickle, and Mr. Egg. The player can score extra points by either crushing them under a falling ingredient or dropping an ingredient while they are standing on it. In the later case, the ingredient falls two extra levels for every enemy caught on it. Crushed or dropped enemies return to the maze after a short time.

At the start of the game, the player is given a limited number of pepper shots to use against enemies. Pressing the button causes Peter to shake a cloud of pepper in the direction he is facing; any enemy touching the cloud will be stunned for a few seconds, and Peter can safely move through them. Bonus food items such as ice cream, coffee and French fries appear on occasion, awarding bonus points and one extra pepper shot when collected.

There are six boards of increasing difficulty, with more burgers/ingredients, more enemies, and/or layouts that make it easier for Peter to become cornered by enemies. After the player completes the sixth board, the cycle repeats.

One life is lost whenever Peter touches a non-stunned enemy, and the game ends once all lives are lost.

Development 
The development of BurgerTime was led by Akio Nakamura, who had previously worked on other Data East arcade games such as Lock 'n' Chase and Super Cobra. Nakamura came up with the idea for BurgerTime while eating a hamburger and thinking about the process of making it.

The game was created using Data East's own hardware, the DECO Cassette System, which allowed for multiple games to be stored on a single cassette and played on the same arcade cabinet. BurgerTime was one of the first games released for this system.

The game's graphics were designed by Toshio Kai, who drew inspiration from Japanese cartoon characters such as Astro Boy and Doraemon. The characters in BurgerTime, such as the chef Peter Pepper and the food items he must assemble, were designed to be cute and appealing to both children and adults.

The game's music and sound effects were composed by Yoko Osaka, who had previously worked on the sound design for other Data East games. The music features upbeat, catchy melodies that match the fast-paced gameplay.

BurgerTime was a commercial success, becoming one of the most popular arcade games of the early 1980s. It was ported to many home gaming systems, including the Atari 2600, NES, and Intellivision, and spawned several sequels and spinoffs over the years.

Home conversions
Mattel Electronics obtained the rights to BurgerTime from Data East and released the Intellivision version in 1983. That year, they also released versions for the Atari 2600, IBM PC, Apple II, and Aquarius. Data East produced a version for the TI-99/4A in 1983, although it was not released until 1984.

In 1984, Mattel produced the ColecoVision version, distributed by Coleco. It was released in May. Ports were then released for the Famicom in 1985, MSX in 1986, and NES in February 1987.

Reception

In Japan, Game Machine listed Hamburger as the 11th highest-grossing arcade video game of 1982. Game Machine later listed Hamburger on their June 15, 1983 issue as being the twenty-third most-successful table arcade unit of the month.

Following its North American debut at the Amusement & Music Operators Association (AMOA) show in November 1982, it was reviewed by Video Games magazine, which listed it as the show's fourth best game, while saying it was the "stupidest, silliest game ever, and that's why you couldn't get people off the Burger Time games with a crowbar!" The review praised the "music, challenging mazes, and comical" characters.

Computer and Video Games gave it a positive review, comparing the level structure to Donkey Kong (1981), stating that BurgerTime has "a charm all its own" and praising the controls. The Deseret News called BurgerTime "one of the real surprises of 1983 for the Intellivision" and gave the ColecoVision version three-and-a-half stars out of four. Computer Games magazine gave the ColecoVision and Coleco Adam versions a positive review, stating that "the terrific flavor" of the arcade game remains but "the playfield has been greatly reduced".

BurgerTime received a Certificate of Merit in the category of "1984 Videogame of the Year (Less than 16K ROM)" at the 5th annual Arkie Awards.

Legacy

Sequels

An arcade spin-off, Peter Pepper's Ice Cream Factory (1984) and an arcade sequel,  (1990), were not widely released. Super BurgerTime stars Peter Pepper Jr. and allows two players to play at once. It is fairly true to the original, but with many added features and a different style of graphics.

A console-only sequel, Diner, was created after the 1984 purchase of Intellivision from Mattel by INTV Corp. It was programmed by Ray Kaestner, the programmer of the Intellivision version of BurgerTime. In Diner, Peter Pepper must kick balls of food so that they roll off platforms and down ramps to land on a large plate at the bottom of the screen, while avoiding or crushing enemy food items that are trying to stop him.

BurgerTime Deluxe was released for the Game Boy in 1991 featuring similar gameplay to the original arcade game. BurgerTime Deluxe was re-released for the Nintendo Switch through the Nintendo Switch Online Game Boy service.

A crossover with The Flintstones titled The Flintstones: BurgerTime in Bedrock was released on Game Boy Color in 2000.

Namco released BurgerTime Delight for mobile devices in 2007. It includes "new graphics, characters and power-ups". There are six "arcade levels" and eight enhanced mode levels with perils of falling ice and rising fire from the grill. Besides the pepper of the classic game, there is now a salt shaker, that when collected stuns all enemies on the screen.

A 3D update, BurgerTime World Tour, was released in 2011 for Xbox Live Arcade and PlayStation Network, and in 2012 for WiiWare. It was delisted from Xbox Live Arcade on April 30, 2014. G-Mode and XSEED Games released a re-imagining of the game on October 8, 2019, titled BurgerTime Party! for the Nintendo Switch, with new modes and redesigns.

Re-releases
The arcade version of BurgerTime has been included in various collections, including Arcade's Greatest Hits: Midway Collection 2 for the PlayStation and Data East Arcade Classics for the Wii. In late 2019/early 2020, it was released with fellow Data East titles Karate Champ, Caveman Ninja and Bad Dudes in an arcade cabinet for home use by manufacturer Arcade1Up. Although the cabinet comes with four games in one, its artwork features only the graphics of Burgertime.

The NES and FDS versions were available on the Wii Virtual Console. Its Game Boy counterpart BurgerTime Deluxe was released for the 3DS Virtual Console in 2011. The NES version is also included in the 2017 compilation Data East All-Star Collection for the Nintendo Entertainment System.

The 1982 arcade version was released through the Arcade Archives series for PlayStation 4 and Nintendo Switch on July 30, 2020.

An updated version of the game has been announced for release exclusively for the Intellivision Amico.

Clones
Clones for home systems include: Mr. Wimpy, Burger Chase, Burger Time (Interceptor Micros), BurgerSpace, Chip Factory, Burger Boy!, Basic Burger, Barmy Burgers, Burger Builder, and Lunchtime. A modern open source variant exists called BurgerSpace.

In popular culture
 Peter Pepper appeared in the movies Wreck-It Ralph and Pixels.
 A BurgerTime parody called "Burgerboss" appears in an episode of Bob's Burgers with the same name.
 The game is parodied as a restaurant in Machinima.com's Sonic for Hire.

Scores
On September 5, 2005, Bryan L. Wagner of Turbotville, Pennsylvania achieved a record score of 8,601,300 and improved to exactly 9,000,000 on June 2, 2006. According to Twin Galaxies, he improved it further to 11,512,500 points on September 19, 2008, at the Challenge Arcade in Wyomissing, Pennsylvania. The MAME world record was verified by Twin Galaxies on December 2, 2016, as 7,837,750 by Roger Edwin Blair III of Mountain City, Tennessee.

See also 
 Arcade's Greatest Hits: The Midway Collection 2

Notes

References

External links
 
 

1982 video games
Apple II games
Arcade video games
Atari 2600 games
ColecoVision games
Commodore 64 games
Data East video games
Marvelous Entertainment franchises
Famicom Disk System games
Game Boy games
Intellivision games
Midway video games
MSX games
Nintendo Entertainment System games
Nintendo Switch games
Platform games
PlayStation 4 games
TI-99/4A games
Video games about food and drink
Video games developed in Japan
Virtual Console games
Windows games
Data East arcade games
Hamster Corporation games